Muaythai at the 2005 Asian Indoor Games was held in Saphan Hin Sports Complex, Phuket, Thailand from 13 November to 18 November 2005.

Medalists

Wai khru

Fighting

Medal table

Results

Wai khru

51 kg
13 November

54 kg
14 November

57 kg
18 November

61 kg
15 November

66 kg
15 November

71 kg
16 November

75 kg
16 November

86 kg
16 November

Fighting

51 kg

54 kg

57 kg
 Kittipong Uamsamang of Thailand originally won the gold medal, but was disqualified after he tested positive for Furosemide.

61 kg

66 kg

71 kg

75 kg

79 kg

86 kg

References

 2005 Asian Indoor Games official website 
 Muay Japan

2005 Asian Indoor Games events
2005
Indoor Games
Indoor Games